The 2018 IIHF U20 Challenge Cup of Asia was an international men's under-20 ice hockey tournament run by the International Ice Hockey Federation. The tournament took place between 12 and 17 December 2017 in Kuala Lumpur, Malaysia and was the fourth edition held since its formation in 2012 under the IIHF Challenge Cup of Asia series of tournaments. To be eligible as a "junior", a player cannot be born earlier than 1998. Malaysia won the tournament after winning all five of their round-robin games and finishing first in the standings. Kyrgyzstan finished in second place and the United Arab Emirates finished third.

Overview
The 2018 IIHF U20 Challenge Cup of Asia began on 12 December 2017 in Kuala Lumpur, Malaysia with games played at the Malaysia National Ice Skating Stadium (MyNISS). The tournament is the first U20 Challenge Cup of Asia to be held since 2014. All four teams from the 2014 edition, Japan, Kazakhstan, MHL Red Stars and South Korea, did not return due to the International Ice Hockey Federation (IIHF) restructuring the tournament for countries which do not participate in the IIHF World U20 Championships. In August 2017 the IIHF announced the participants for the tournament. India, Kyrgyzstan, Malaysia and the Philippines all made their debut in under-20 international competition. The United Arab Emirates returned to international competition having last played a series of exhibition games in 2013 during the 2013 IIHF World U20 Championships.

The tournament consisted of a single round-robin with each team competing in four games. Malaysia won the tournament after winning all five of their games and finished first in the standings. Kyrgyzstan finished second after losing only to Malaysia and the United Arab Emirates finished in third. Malaysia's Mohammad Hariz Mohammad Oryza Ananda led the tournament in scoring with 18 points and was named the most valuable player. Shahrul Ilyas Abdul Shukor of Malaysia finished as the tournaments leading goaltender with a save percentage of 97.56. The IIHF Directorate however awarded best goalkeeper to Abdulrahman Al Hosani of the United Arab Emirates. Malaysia's Chee Ming Bryan Lim was named the best forward and Benjamin Jorge Imperial of the Philippines was named the best defenceman.

Standings
The final standings of the tournament.

Fixtures
All times are local. (MST – UTC+8)

Scoring leaders
List shows the top ten skaters sorted by points, then goals, assists, and the lower penalties in minutes.

Leading goaltenders
Only the top five goaltenders, based on save percentage, who have played at least 40% of their team's minutes are included in this list.

References

External links
Tournament page at IIHF.com

IIHF U20 Challenge Cup of Asia
IIHF Challenge Cups of Asia
International ice hockey competitions hosted by Malaysia
2018 in Malaysian sport
December 2017 sports events in Asia
Asian ice hockey competitions for junior teams